Kinkade is a surname. Notable people with the surname include:

 Amelia Kinkade (born 1963), American actress and animal communicator 
 Bill Kinkade (born 1957), American politician
 Dale Kinkade (1933–2004), linguist
 David Kinkade (born 1983), American former musician
 Jude Kinkade, fictional character from the VH1 series Hit the Floor
 Kat Kinkade (1930–2008), American activist
 Lynda Kinkade, Australian journalist
 Mike Kinkade (born 1973), American baseballer and coach
 Reynolds R. Kinkade (1854–1935), American jurist
 Thomas Kinkade (1958–2012), American painter

See also
 Kincade (disambiguation)
 Kincaid (disambiguation)
 Kinkaid (disambiguation)